Rateh is a village in Mirzapur, Uttar Pradesh, India. It is also market area for people of nearby villages.This market is well known for buying clothes, groceries, snacks and many more things.

References

Villages in Mirzapur district